Shahida Begum is a Pakistani politician who has been a member of the National Assembly of Pakistan since August 2018.

Education
She has a degree of masters in Chemistry and a Bachelor of Education.

Political career

She was elected to the National Assembly of Pakistan as a candidate of Muttahida Majlis-e-Amal on a reserved seat for women from Khyber Pakhtunkhwa in 2018 Pakistani general election.

References

Living people
Women members of the National Assembly of Pakistan
Pakistani MNAs 2018–2023
Muttahida Majlis-e-Amal MNAs
Year of birth missing (living people)
21st-century Pakistani women politicians